Fagnano Olona is a town and comune located in the province of Varese, in the Lombardy region of northern Italy.

References

Cities and towns in Lombardy